Zeh is a surname. Notable people with the surname include:

H. Dieter Zeh (1932-2018), German physicist
Harry Ntimban-Zeh (born 1973), French footballer
Judy Zeh, American statistician
Juli Zeh (born 1974), German writer
Norbert Zeh, Canadian computer scientist
Ray Zeh (c. 1914–2003), American football player
Stephen Zeh, American basket weaver